Pirkle is a surname. Notable people with the surname include:

Clay Pirkle (born 1967), American politician
Estus Pirkle (1930–2005), American Baptist minister

See also
Bowman-Pirkle House, formerly owned by Civil War veteran Noah Pirkle